Members of the New South Wales Legislative Council who served in the 56th Parliament were elected at the 2011 and 2015 elections. As members serve eight-year terms, half of the Council was elected in 2011 and did not face re-election in 2015, and the members elected in 2015 will not face re-election until 2023. The President was Don Harwin until 30 January 2017 and then John Ajaka.

References

Members of New South Wales parliaments by term
21st-century Australian politicians
New South Wales Legislative Council